Conus coelinae, common name Celine's cone, is a species of sea snail, a marine gastropod mollusk in the family Conidae, the cone snails and their allies.

Like all species within the genus Conus, these snails are predatory and venomous. They are capable of "stinging" humans, therefore live ones should be handled carefully or not at all.

The former subspecies Conus coelinae spiceri Bartsch & Rehder, 1943 has been elevated to the status of genus Conus spiceri Bartsch & Rehder, 1943

Description
The size of the shell varies between 55 mm and 128 mm.

Distribution
This species occurs in the Indian Ocean off the Mascarene Basin; in the Pacific Ocean off Hawaii and the Philippines; off the Loyalty Islands , New Caledonia, Solomon Islands, Marshall Islands, New Zealand and Australia (Queensland)

References

 Crosse, H. 1858. Observations sur la genre Cone et description de trois espèces nouvelles, avec une catalogue alphabétique des cones actuellement connus. Revue et Magasin de Zoologie Pure et Appliquée 2 10: 113–209, 1 pl.
 Cernohorsky, W.O. 1978. Tropical Pacific Marine Shells. Sydney : Pacific Publications 352 pp., 68 pls. 
 Drivas, J.; Jay, M. (1987). Coquillages de La Réunion et de l'Île Maurice. Collection Les Beautés de la Nature. Delachaux et Niestlé: Neuchâtel. . 159 pp.
 Delsaerdt, 1989 Delsaerdt, A. 1989. On the true identity of Conus coelinae Crosse, 1858 and description of Conus pseudocoelinae new species. Gloria Maris 28(1): 5–9
 Röckel, D., Korn, W. & Kohn, A.J. 1995. Manual of the Living Conidae. Volume 1: Indo-Pacific Region. Wiesbaden : Hemmen 517 pp.
 Puillandre N., Duda T.F., Meyer C., Olivera B.M. & Bouchet P. (2015). One, four or 100 genera? A new classification of the cone snails. Journal of Molluscan Studies. 81: 1–23

External links
 The Conus Biodiversity website
 Revue et Magasin de Zoologie Pure et Appliquée 10: plate 2.
 Cone Shells – Knights of the Sea

coelinae
Gastropods described in 1858